Xenomorph is a Dutch death metal band formed in 1994 in Leiden, the Netherlands. The band is named after the Xenomorphs, fictional extraterrestrial creatures created by the Swiss artist H.R. Giger and used in the Alien franchise.

Xenomorph made a successful debut album, Baneful Stealth Desire, which was released by System Shock Records from Germany in 2001. In 2002 they toured Europe with Master and Krabathor.

In 2005, Dutch label Under Her Black Wings released Xenomorph's second album, Necrophilia Mon Amour. The album seems to have suffered from a media boycott in Germany, since it contains a song called "Treblinka," in reference to the Treblinka extermination camp. In 2006 the band went on tour through Europe again, this time with Macabre, Jungle Rot, and Impaled Nazarene.

Members

Current members
 De Tombe - vocals
 Kreft - guitar
 JRA - bass
 Bomber - drums

Former members
 Coert Zwart - guitar
 Carmen van der Ploeg - vocals
 Vincent Scheerman - guitar

Discography

 Baneful Stealth Desire (CD, System Shock Records, 2001)
 Necrophilia Mon Amour (CD, Under Her Black Wings, 2005)

References

External links
 Myspace
 Last.fm
 Review of Necrophilia Mon Amour (Dutch)
 Review of Necrophilia Mon Amour (Dutch)
 Allmusic bio

Dutch death metal musical groups
Dutch heavy metal musical groups
Musical groups established in 1994
Musical quartets